James Madison Holloway (September 22, 1908 – April 15, 1997) was a Major League Baseball pitcher who played for the Philadelphia Phillies in .

A single in his only turn at-bat left Holloway with a rare MLB career batting average of 1.000.

External links

1908 births
1997 deaths
Baseball players from Louisiana
Major League Baseball pitchers
Philadelphia Phillies players
People from Plaquemine, Louisiana